Mark E. Ferner (born September 5, 1965) is a Canadian former professional ice hockey defenceman.

Ferner was born in Regina, Saskatchewan. Selected 194th overall by the Buffalo Sabres in the 1983 NHL Entry Draft, Ferner also played for the Washington Capitals, Mighty Ducks of Anaheim, and Detroit Red Wings, playing a total of 94 regular season games, scoring 3 goals and 10 assists for 13 points and collecting 51 penalty minutes.

Career statistics

Awards
 WHL 	West First All-Star Team – 1985

External links
Profile at hockeydraftcentral.com
Profile at legends of hockey.net

1965 births
Living people
Adirondack Red Wings players
Baltimore Skipjacks players
Buffalo Sabres draft picks
Buffalo Sabres players
Canadian ice hockey defencemen
Detroit Red Wings players
Everett Silvertips coaches
Houston Aeros (1994–2013) players
Ice hockey people from Saskatchewan
Kamloops Blazers coaches
Kamloops Blazers players
Kamloops Junior Oilers players
Kassel Huskies players
Long Beach Ice Dogs (IHL) players
Long Beach Ice Dogs (WCHL) players
Mighty Ducks of Anaheim players
New Haven Senators players
Orlando Solar Bears (IHL) players
Rochester Americans players
St. John's Maple Leafs players
San Diego Gulls (IHL) players
Schwenninger Wild Wings players
Sportspeople from Regina, Saskatchewan
Washington Capitals players
Canadian expatriate ice hockey players in Germany
Canadian ice hockey coaches